Pike Township is a township in Clearfield County, Pennsylvania, United States. The population was 2,308 at the 2020 census.

Geography
According to the United States Census Bureau, the township has a total area of 42.1 square miles (109.0 km2), of which 40.7 square miles (105.4 km2)  is land and 1.4 square miles (3.6 km2)  (3.33%) is water.

Communities
Bloomington
Bridgeport
Olanta
Curwensville

Demographics

As of the census of 2000, there were 2,309 people, 856 households, and 677 families living in the township.  The population density was 56.7 people per square mile (21.9/km2).  There were 930 housing units at an average density of 22.9/sq mi (8.8/km2).  The racial makeup of the township was 99.35% White, 0.04% African American, 0.17% Native American, 0.22% Asian, and 0.22% from two or more races. Hispanic or Latino of any race were 0.13% of the population.

There were 856 households, out of which 31.7% had children under the age of 18 living with them, 67.3% were married couples living together, 7.4% had a female householder with no husband present, and 20.9% were non-families. 17.1% of all households were made up of individuals, and 7.9% had someone living alone who was 65 years of age or older.  The average household size was 2.66 and the average family size was 3.00.

In the township the population was spread out, with 23.3% under the age of 18, 6.8% from 18 to 24, 29.6% from 25 to 44, 26.9% from 45 to 64, and 13.4% who were 65 years of age or older.  The median age was 40 years. For every 100 females there were 103.8 males.  For every 100 females age 18 and over, there were 103.0 males.

The median income for a household in the township was $37,321, and the median income for a family was $40,959. Males had a median income of $28,456 versus $20,142 for females. The per capita income for the township was $15,670.  About 6.7% of families and 9.0% of the population were below the poverty line, including 11.2% of those under age 18 and 3.9% of those age 65 or over.

Education
Local children attend the schools of the Curwensville Area School District.

References

Populated places established in 1797
Townships in Clearfield County, Pennsylvania